A candle is a source of light, typically made of wax.

Candle may also refer to:

Places
Candle, Alaska
Candle Lake (Saskatchewan), Canada

Art, media, and entertainment

Literature
Candle (novel), 2000 novel by John Barnes

Music

Artists and labels
Candle (band), American Christian rock band
Candle Records, Australian record label

Albums and EPs
Candles (album), 1980 album by Heatwave
Candles (EP), a 2011 EP by Hey Monday

Songs
"Candle" (Guy Sebastian song), 2016
"Candle" (Jason McCoy song), 1995
"Candle (Sick and Tired)", 2008 song by The White Tie Affair
"Candle" (Skinny Puppy song), 1996
"Candle", a 1988 song by Sonic Youth from the album Daydream Nation
"Candles" (song), a song by Hey Monday 2011
"Candles", 1996 single by Alex Reece
"Candle", a song from "Fool's Mate", debut solo album by Peter Hammill, 1971

Video Games
Candleman, a 2014 video game

Enterprises
Center for the Advancement of Natural Discoveries using Light Emission (CANDLE), Synchrotron radiation facility project in Armenia
Candle Corporation, software company that was acquired by IBM

Measurement and timekeeping
Candle (unit), old unit of luminous intensity, now replaced by the SI unit candela
Advent candle
Candle clock
Candling, method of observing the growth of an embryo inside an egg, using a bright light source
An entry on a candle chart or candlestick chart, used for plotting stock market prices

Nature
Candle Hap, a species of freshwater fish found in Africa
Candle ice, a form of rotten ice that develops in columns perpendicular to the surface of a lake

Other uses
Candle tree (disambiguation)

See also
Candlelight (disambiguation)
Candler (disambiguation)
CANDLES Holocaust Museum and Education Center in Terre Haute, Indiana
Roman candle (firework)
Kandle (disambiguation)
Candel (disambiguation)
Cadle (disambiguation)